Catherine Brown (or similar) may refer to:

Arts and entertainment
 Catherine Brown, Miss Colorado 1978
 Catherine Brown, Miss Wyoming 2011
 Catherine Madox Brown (1850–1927), artist and model associated with the Pre-Raphaelites
 Katharine Brown (born 1987), Miss Scotland 2009 and Miss United Kingdom 2010
 Kathy Brown (born 1970), American R&B, dance, and house singer
 Kathryn Brown, British art historian
 Katie Brown (TV personality) (born 1963), American home and gardening TV show host, author, and art historian
 Kitty Brown, American blues singer
Cath Brown (artist) (1933–2004), New Zealand master weaver

Sportspeople
 Catherine Brown (footballer) (born 1994), Australian footballer
 Cathy Brown (boxer) (born 1970), British ex-professional boxer
 Katherine Brown (cricketer) (born 1953), English cricketer
 Katie Brown (rock climber) (born 1981), American rock climber
 Catherine Gibson (1931–2013), married surname Brown, Scottish swimmer

Politicians
 Kate Brown (born 1960), governor of the State of Oregon (2015– )
 Kathleen Brown (born 1945), American attorney and politician from California
 Cathy Gordon Brown (born 1965), independent candidate for president of the United States, 2000
 Katherine Whelan Brown (1872–1942), member of the New Jersey General Assembly

Academics
 Katheryn Russell-Brown (born 1961), professor of law at University of Florida's Fredric G. Levin College of Law
 Katrina Brown, professor of development studies at the University of East Anglia
 Kate Brown (professor) (born 1965), professor at Massachusetts Institute of Technology
 Kate Robson Brown, British anthropologist
 Katherine Brown (psychologist), British psychologist

Others
 Catharine Brown (Cherokee teacher) (–1823), Cherokee woman and missionary teacher
 Kate Brown (plaintiff) (1840–1883), United States Senate employee and African American civil rights activist
 Katie Brown, fictional character in Calamity Jane
 Katherine 'Kath' Brown, character in Harry Brown (film)
 Kate Louise Brown (1857–1921), American children's educator and author
 Kate Moore Brown (1871–1945), American musician, clubwoman and traveler

See also
 Kathleen Browne (1878–1943), Irish politician, farmer, writer, historian and archaeologist
 Kathie Browne (1930–2003), American film and television actress
 Kathleen Brown (disambiguation)